Pubescence 3 is a 2012 Chinese teen sex comedy film and a sequel to Pubescence and Paradise Lost as part of the Pubescence theatrical series. It was directed and written by Guan Xiaojie, starring Zhao Yihuan and Wang Yi. The film was released in China on 15 May 2012.

Cast
 Zhao Yihuan as Cheng Xiaoyu.
 Wang Yi as Wang Xiaofei.
 Yang Feifan as Feifan.
 Li Luqian as Yang Qian.
 Xie Jin as Su Zi.
 Qiu Xiaochan as Ni Ni.
 You Yitian as Yitian.
 Liang Tingyu as Liangzi.
 Wang Mengting as Chanel.
 Qin Hanlei as the instructor.
 Cheng Zicheng as Ajian.
 Guo Jiawei as Lizi.

Soundtrack
 You Yiyian - "If Not You"
 Liu Yixun - "After Rain"
 A Qing - "Hourglass"
 Zhang Yuanyuan - "To Our Youth"

References

External links
 

2010s teen comedy films
Chinese sex comedy films
Films directed by Guan Xiaojie
2012 comedy films
2012 films